This is a list of Yiddish Abbreviations.

Sorting Order

The entries are sorted according to the Hebrew alphabet. Prefixes indicating prepositions and articles (such as ב, ד, ה, ש, כ) have generally been removed, with the following exceptions:
Where the abbreviation is incomprehensible or meaningless without the prefix
Where the prefix is so integral to the acronym that variants without it rarely, if ever, occur

For ease of searching and sorting, double letters (ײ and װ) have been treated as if they were two separate letters.

Numeronyms and other abbreviations with numerical elements

Some abbreviations included here are actually gematria (Hebrew numeronyms), but the number is so closely associated with some noun that it is grammatically used as a noun and is synonymous with it, for example ל"ו, lamed vov.

Other abbreviations contain a variable gematria component alongside other words, like the chapter references פי"א perek yud-alef (chapter 11) or פ"ט perek tet (chapter 9). Rather than list separate entries for every possible gematria, or use only one example number, the gematria component is replaced with [x] to produce (for example) [x]"פ.

Abbreviations from other Hebraic languages

Some Hebrew and Aramaic abbreviations may not be included here; more may be found in the List of Hebrew abbreviations and the List of Aramaic abbreviations, respectively.

Many of the abbreviations here may be similar or identical to those in the other lists of acronyms. In fact, a work written in Yiddish may have Hebrew and Aramaic abbreviations interspersed throughout, much as an Aramaic work may borrow from Hebrew (ex. Talmud, Midrash, Zohar) and Hebrew from Aramaic (ex. Shulchan Aruch, Mishneh Torah). Although somewhat less common than Hebrew abbreviations, some Yiddish material contains Aramaic abbreviations too (for example, Chassidic responsa, commentaries, and other material).

List

א
.און אנדערע, א.א ("un andereh") – and others 
.און א‌ַלזא װײַטער, א.א.װ (un alzo veiter) - and so on
.און אזוי װײַטער, א.א.װ (un azoy veiter) - and so on

ז
 ז׳, זייט (zayt) – page

ח
חבר, ח׳ ("chaver") – friend, colleague
חברים, חח׳ ("chaveyrim") – friends, colleagues
 [x]"ח ,[x] חלק (cheilek [x]) - (Hebrew) part [x]

י
יארצייט, יא"צ (yartzeit) - anniversary of someone's passing, lit. time of year

מ
[x] 'מ, [x] משנה (mishnah [x]) - (Hebrew) teaching [x]

נ
 נ.מ., נאך מיטאג (noch mitog) – in the afternoon

ס
[x]"ס ,[x] סמן (siman [x]) - (Hebrew) chapter/section [x]
[x]"ספ ,[x] סוף פרק (sof perek [x]) - (Hebrew) the end of chapter [x]

פ
[x] 'פ ,[x] פרק (perek [x]) - (Hebrew) chapter [x]. But, see פ"ק
פרק קמא, פ"ק (perek kama) - (Aramaic) the first chapter. See also [x] 'פ

צ
צענטראל קאמיטעט, צ.ק. ("tsentral komitet") – Central Committee

ק
.ּקאַפּיטל/קאַפּיטלעך, קאַפּ'/קאַפ (kapitel/kapitlech) - chapter(s), esp. of the Book of Psalms

Yiddish
+ Yiddish